Primolius is a genus of macaws comprising three species, which are native to South America. They are mainly green parrots with complex colouring including blues, reds and yellows. They have long tails, a large curved beak, and bare facial skin typical of macaws in general. They are less than 50 cm long, much smaller than the macaws of the Ara genus. Macaws less than about 50 cm long, including the genus Primolius,  are sometimes called "mini-macaws".

Taxonomy
The genus has three monotypic species:

Genus Primolius, Bonaparte 1857:
Blue-headed macaw, Primolius couloni (Sclater PL, 1876)
Blue-winged macaw or Illiger's macaw, Primolius maracana (Vieillot, 1816)
Golden-collared macaw, Primolius auricollis (Cassin, 1853)

Species

See also
List of macaws

References

 
Bird genera
Arini (tribe)
Taxa named by Charles Lucien Bonaparte